James Fox MBE (born 2 May 1992) is a British Paralympic rower who is a five time World champion and a Paralympic champion in the mixed coxed four Paralympic events. He started rowing when he was eleven.

He started his career at the Peterborough City Rowing Club. Fox broke his back in a car accident shortly after starting university.

Fox attended the University of London where he rowed for the University of London Boat Club (ULBC).

References

1992 births
Living people
Sportspeople from Peterborough
English male rowers
Paralympic rowers of Great Britain
Rowers at the 2016 Summer Paralympics
Rowers at the 2020 Summer Paralympics
Medalists at the 2016 Summer Paralympics
Medalists at the 2020 Summer Paralympics
Paralympic medalists in rowing
Paralympic gold medalists for Great Britain
Members of the Order of the British Empire